Cecil Moss (12 February 1925 – 27 October 2017) was a South African rugby union player, coach and a professional physician. He was also a qualified medical doctor (anaesthetist) and was part of the medical team who removed the heart from the first heart transplant donor, Denise Darvall. Moss was Jewish and had two children.

He had 4 caps for South Africa in 1949. Educated at the South African College Schools, he developed close involvement with the University of Cape Town. Moss was vice-captain of the Springboks in 1949, when they beat  4–0, and played four winning tests for South Africa, debuting on 16 July 1949.

He was head coach of South Africa from 1982 to 1989 and achieved 10 wins and only 2 losses during his time in office. He missed the 1987 Rugby World Cup due to the international sports boycott against his country's apartheid policies.

See also
List of select Jewish rugby union players

References

External links
 Cecil Moss on scrum.com
 Letter from Cape Town in The Jewish Chronicle
 The Glory of the Game about the Ten Jewish Springboks.

1925 births
2017 deaths
South Africa international rugby union players
South African rugby union players
South African rugby union coaches
Jewish rugby union players
South African Jews
People from the Western Cape
South African anaesthetists
Jewish South African sportspeople
Alumni of South African College Schools
Rugby union players from the Western Cape
Rugby union wings